Osceola County is a county located in the U.S. state of Iowa. As of the 2020 census the population was 6,192, making it the state's fifth-least populous county. It is named for Seminole war chief Osceola. The county seat is Sibley, named for H. H. Sibley of Minnesota.

History
Osceola County was formed in 1871. It was named after the eponymous chief of the Seminole.  It is the smallest and most recent county in Iowa.  In the same year the first settler arrived, Captain Eldred Huff, and laid his claim.  On January 1, 1872, the county government conferred for the first time.  The first courthouse, constructed of wood, was built in November of the following year and simultaneously served as the conference chamber, school and church.  In September 1903, the second courthouse was finished and was wired for electricity in October, 1915.

Geography
It is the third-smallest county in Iowa by land area and smallest by total area. The highest natural point in Iowa, Hawkeye Point at 1,670 feet (509 m), is located in Osceola County.

Major highways
 U.S. Highway 59
 Iowa Highway 9
 Iowa Highway 60

Adjacent counties
Nobles County, Minnesota  (northwest)
Jackson County, Minnesota  (northeast)
Dickinson County  (east)
O'Brien County  (south)
Lyon County  (west)

Demographics

2020 census
There were 2,878 housing units, of which 2,599 were occupied.

2010 census
There were 2,990 housing units, of which 2,682 were occupied.

2000 census

As of the census of 2000, there were 7,003 people, 2,778 households, and 1,941 families residing in the county.  The population density was 18 people per square mile (7/km2).  There were 3,012 housing units at an average density of 8 per square mile (3/km2).  The racial makeup of the county was 98.04% White, 0.11% Black or African American, 0.26% Native American, 0.20% Asian, 0.01% Pacific Islander, 0.84% from other races, and 0.53% from two or more races.  1.78% of the population were Hispanic or Latino of any race.

There were 2,778 households, out of which 31.70% had children under the age of 18 living with them, 62.00% were married couples living together, 5.10% had a female householder with no husband present, and 30.10% were non-families. 27.60% of all households were made up of individuals, and 15.10% had someone living alone who was 65 years of age or older.  The average household size was 2.48 and the average family size was 3.03.

In the county, the population was spread out, with 26.10% under the age of 18, 7.20% from 18 to 24, 26.20% from 25 to 44, 21.60% from 45 to 64, and 18.90% who were 65 years of age or older.  The median age was 40 years. For every 100 females there were 95.00 males.  For every 100 females age 18 and over, there were 94.30 males.

The median income for a household in the county was $34,274, and the median income for a family was $41,977. Males had a median income of $29,624 versus $20,522 for females. The per capita income for the county was $16,463.  About 6.00% of families and 7.00% of the population were below the poverty line, including 7.90% of those under age 18 and 9.80% of those age 65 or over.

Communities

Cities
Ashton
Harris
Melvin
Ocheyedan
Sibley

Townships
Allison
Baker
East Holman
Fairview
Gilman
Goewey
Harrison
Horton
Ocheyedan
Viola
West Holman
Wilson

Unincorporated communities
Allendorf
Cloverdale
May City

Population ranking
The population ranking of the following table is based on the 2020 census of Osceola County.

† county seat

Politics

In presidential elections, Osceola County voters have cast their lot chiefly with Republican candidates for office, with the last Democrat to win the county being Lyndon Johnson in 1964.

See also

Osceola County Courthouse
National Register of Historic Places listings in Osceola County, Iowa

References

External links

Official Osceola County website
Osceola County Economic Development

 
Iowa placenames of Native American origin
1871 establishments in Iowa
Populated places established in 1871